Ricardo Ippel (born 31 August 1990) is a Dutch professional footballer plays as a midfielder for Tweede Divisie club De Treffers.

Career
Ahead of the 2019–20 season, Ippel joined Belgian First Division B club Lommel SK on a two-year contract with an option for one further year.

On 12 March 2021, De Treffers announced the signing of Ippel, with him joining the club from the 2021–22 season.

Honours
Willem II
 Eerste Divisie: 2013–14

References

External links
 
 

1990 births
Living people
Dutch footballers
Association football midfielders
Dutch expatriate footballers
Dutch expatriate sportspeople in Belgium
Eerste Divisie players
Eredivisie players
Challenger Pro League players
Tweede Divisie players
Expatriate footballers in Belgium
Willem II (football club) players
MVV Maastricht players
Lommel S.K. players
De Treffers players
People from Altena, North Brabant
Footballers from North Brabant